Hal Robson (August 16, 1911 – July 2, 1996) was a Canadian-American racecar driver active in the 1940s. He was the brother of 1946 Indianapolis 500 winner George Robson. He became a US citizen at the same time as his brother in 1937.

Indianapolis 500 results

References

American racing drivers
Indianapolis 500 drivers
1911 births
1996 deaths
AAA Championship Car drivers
Sportspeople from Toronto
Racing drivers from Ontario
Canadian emigrants to the United States